The Voice of Islam is a narrowcast radio station based in Lakemba and broadcasting to many parts of Sydney through a network of low power transmitters.

The objectives of The Voice of Islam include sharing Islam principles with the rest of Australia, to provide information about Islamic beliefs and practices and to broadcast programmes that reflect cultural heritage.

Programs
Broadcasting recitation of the Quran, Islamic lectures, live broadcasts of Friday sermons, local and international news, radio documentaries, talk shows and programmes on contemporary topics, and trivia and competitions.

See also	
 List of radio stations in Australia

References

External links

Radio stations in Sydney
Islamic radio stations in Australia